The men's trap competition at the 2002 Asian Games in Busan, South Korea was held on 2 and 3 October at the Changwon International Shooting Range.

Schedule
All times are Korea Standard Time (UTC+09:00)

Records

Results

Qualification

Final

References 

2002 Asian Games Report, Pages 642–643
Qualification Results
Final Results

External links
Official website

Men Shotgun T